A spermatogonium (plural: spermatogonia) is an undifferentiated male germ cell. Spermatogonia undergo spermatogenesis to form mature spermatozoa in the seminiferous tubules of the testis.

There are three subtypes of spermatogonia in humans:
Type A (dark) cells, with dark nuclei. These cells are reserve spermatogonial stem cells which do not usually undergo active mitosis. 
Type A (pale) cells, with pale nuclei. These are the spermatogonial stem cells that undergo active mitosis. These cells divide to produce Type B cells.
Type B cells, which undergo growth and become primary spermatocytes.

Anticancer drugs

Anticancer drugs such as doxorubicin and vincristine can adversely affect male fertility by damaging the DNA of proliferative spermatogonial stem cells.  Experimental exposure of rat undifferentiated spermatogonia to doxorubicin and vincristine indicated that these cells are able to respond to DNA damage by increasing their expression of DNA repair genes, and that this response likely partially prevents DNA break accumulation.  In addition to a DNA repair response, exposure of spermatogonia to doxorubicin can also induce programmed cell death (apoptosis).

Additional images

References

Germ cells